Karim Diniyev (born on 5 September 1993) is an Azerbaijani footballer who last played as a defender for Shamakhi FK in the Azerbaijan Premier League.

Club career
Diniyev made his debut in the Azerbaijan Premier League for Keşla on 5 May 2012, match against Sumgayit.

On 18 July 2020, Diniyev signed one-year contract with Zira FK.

Personal life
Diniyev's father, Shahin Diniyev, is the current manager, for whom his elder brother Joshgun Diniyev also plays for Sabah FC.

Honours
Neftçi
Azerbaijan Premier League (1): 2011–12

References

External links
 

1993 births
Living people
Association football defenders
Azerbaijani footballers
Azerbaijan youth international footballers
Azerbaijan Premier League players
Neftçi PFK players
Sumgayit FK players
AZAL PFK players
Kapaz PFK players
Sabail FK players
Sabah FC (Azerbaijan) players
Shamakhi FK players
Zira FK players
FC Akhmat Grozny players